Erich Albrecht (31 March 1889 – 30 November 1949) was a German international footballer.

References

External links
 

1889 births
1949 deaths
German footballers
Germany international footballers
Association football forwards
Footballers from Leipzig